Cycas nayagarhensis is a species found only in Nayagarh district of Odisha in India. The species was recently discovered by Indian scientists Rita Singh, P. Radha, and J.S. Khuraijam.

References

External links
 Cycas of India

nayagarhensis